Anastasia Grymalska (born 12 July 1990) is an Italian professional tennis player.

She has a career-high WTA singles ranking of 213, achieved on 12 May 2014, and a best WTA doubles ranking of 169, reached in June 2019. She has won 20 singles and 34 doubles titles on the ITF Circuit.

Grymalska made her WTA Tour main-draw debut at the 2011 Palermo Ladies Open where she was handed a wildcard. With another wildcard, she played at the 2012 Palermo Ladies Open.
Without wildcards, she made her main-draw debut at the 2013 Swedish Open, and the 2014 Marrakesh Grand Prix.

Grymalska made her doubles main-draw debut on WTA Tour at the 2011 Palermo Ladies Open, partnering Gioia Barbieri.

Grand Slam singles performance timeline

ITF Circuit finals

Singles: 36 (20 titles, 16 runner-ups)

Doubles: 57 (34 titles, 23 runner-ups)

Notes

References

External links
 
 

1990 births
Living people
Italian female tennis players
Ukrainian emigrants to Italy
Sportspeople from Kyiv
Sportspeople from Pescara
Naturalised citizens of Italy
Naturalised tennis players
Italian people of Ukrainian descent
Mediterranean Games medalists in tennis
Mediterranean Games silver medalists for Italy
Competitors at the 2013 Mediterranean Games